Players and pairs who neither have high enough rankings nor receive wild cards may participate in a qualifying tournament held one week before the annual Wimbledon Tennis Championships.

Seeds

  Ivan Baron /  Mahesh Bhupathi (second round)
  Noam Behr /  Dick Norman (second round)
 n/a
  Lionel Barthez /  Ģirts Dzelde (first round)
  Geoff Grant /  Claude N'Goran (second round)
  David DiLucia /  Scott Humphries (qualified)

Qualifiers

  Aleksandar Kitinov /  Gerald Mandl
  Massimo Ardinghi /  Nicola Bruno
  David DiLucia /  Scott Humphries

Qualifying draw

First qualifier

Second qualifier

Third qualifier

External links

1996 Wimbledon Championships – Men's draws and results at the International Tennis Federation

Men's Doubles Qualifying
Wimbledon Championship by year – Men's doubles qualifying